Tubulavirales is an order of viruses.

Taxonomy
The following families are recognized:
 Inoviridae
 Paulinoviridae
 Plectroviridae

References

Virus orders